Christopher Charles Conner (born October 25, 1957) is a United States district judge of the United States District Court for the Middle District of Pennsylvania.

Education and career

Born in Harrisburg, Pennsylvania, Conner received a Bachelor of Arts degree from Cornell University in 1979 and a Juris Doctor from Pennsylvania State University - Dickinson Law in 1982. He was in private practice in Pennsylvania from 1982 to 2002, and was an adjunct professor at the Widener University School of Law in 2000.

District court service

On February 28, 2002, Conner was nominated by President George W. Bush to a seat on the United States District Court for the Middle District of Pennsylvania vacated by Sylvia H. Rambo. Conner was confirmed by the United States Senate on July 26, 2002, and received his commission on July 29, 2002. He served as Chief Judge from September 1, 2013 to June 1, 2020.

Notable case

On September 13, 2011, Conner ruled the individual insurance mandate in the Patient Protection and Affordable Care Act as unconstitutional saying, in part, “The federal government is one of limited enumerated powers, and Congress’s efforts to remedy the ailing health care and health insurance markets must fit squarely within the boundaries of those powers.”

References

Sources

1957 births
Living people
21st-century American judges
Cornell University alumni
Dickinson School of Law alumni
Judges of the United States District Court for the Middle District of Pennsylvania
People from Harrisburg, Pennsylvania
United States district court judges appointed by George W. Bush